Borbiconi is a surname. Notable people with the surname include:

 Christophe Borbiconi (born 1973), French footballer
 Marino Borbiconi, Sammarinese politician
 Stéphane Borbiconi (born 1979), French footballer